Slovenia participated in the Eurovision Song Contest 2015 with the song "Here for You" written by Raay, Marjetka Vovk and Charlie Mason. The song was performed by Maraaya. Slovenian broadcaster Radiotelevizija Slovenija (RTV Slovenija) organised the national final EMA 2015 in order to select the Slovenian entry for the 2015 contest in Vienna, Austria. Eight entries competed in the national final where the winner was selected over two rounds of voting. In the first round, the top two entries were selected by a three-member jury panel. In the second round, "Here for You" performed by Maraaya was selected as the winner entirely by a public vote.

Slovenia was drawn to compete in the second semi-final of the Eurovision Song Contest which took place on 21 May 2015. Performing during the show in position 16, "Here for You" was announced among the top 10 entries of the second semi-final and therefore qualified to compete in the final on 23 May. It was later revealed that Slovenia placed fifth out of the 17 participating countries in the semi-final with 92 points. In the final, Slovenia performed in position 1 and placed fourteenth out of the 27 participating countries, scoring 39 points.

Background 

Prior to the 2015 contest, Slovenia had participated in the Eurovision Song Contest twenty times since its first entry in 1993. Slovenia's highest placing in the contest, to this point, has been seventh place, which the nation achieved on two occasions: in 1995 with the song "Prisluhni mi" performed by Darja Švajger and in 2001 with the song "Energy" performed by Nuša Derenda. The country's only other top ten result was achieved in 1997 when Tanja Ribič performing "Zbudi se" placed tenth. Since the introduction of semi-finals to the format of the contest in 2004, Slovenia had thus far only managed to qualify to the final on three occasions. In 2014, "Round and Round" performed by Tinkara Kovač qualified to the final and placed twenty-fifth.

The Slovenian national broadcaster, Radiotelevizija Slovenija (RTV Slovenija), broadcasts the event within Slovenia and organises the selection process for the nation's entry. RTV Slovenija confirmed Slovenia's participation in the 2015 Eurovision Song Contest on 10 October 2014. The Slovenian entry for the Eurovision Song Contest has traditionally been selected through a national final entitled Evrovizijska Melodija (EMA), which has been produced with variable formats. To this point, the broadcaster has only foregone the use of this national final in 2013 when the Slovenian entry was internally selected. For 2015, the broadcaster opted to organise EMA 2015 to select the Slovenian entry.

Before Eurovision

EMA 2015 
EMA 2015 was the 19th edition of the Slovenian national final format Evrovizijska Melodija (EMA). The competition was used by RTV Slovenija to select Slovenia's entry for the Eurovision Song Contest 2015 and was broadcast on TV SLO1 and online via the broadcaster's website rtvslo.si.

Format
Eight songs competed in a televised show where the winner was selected over two rounds of voting. In the first round, a three-member expert jury selected two finalists out of the eight competing songs to proceed to a superfinal. Each member of the expert jury assigned a score of 1 (lowest score) to 5 (highest score) to each song with the top two being determined by the songs that receive the highest overall scores when the jury votes are combined. Ties were broken by giving priority to the song(s) that achieved a higher number of top scores (5), which would be followed by each juror indicating their preferred song should a tie still have persisted. In the superfinal, public televoting exclusively determined the winner. In case of technical problems with the televote, the jury would have voted to determine the winner in a similar process as in the first round of the competition.

Competing entries
Artists and composers were able to submit their entries to the broadcaster between 24 November 2014 and 21 December 2014. 145 entries were received by the broadcaster during the submission period. An expert committee consisting of Darja Švajger (singer, vocal coach and 1995 and 1999 Slovenian Eurovision entrant), Matej Wolf (musician, instrumentalist, arranger, producer and music teacher), Aleksander Radić (Head of the Slovenian delegation at the Eurovision Song Contest) and Jernej Vene (music editor for Radio Val 202) selected eight artists and songs for the competition from the received submissions. The competing artists were announced on 5 January 2016. Among the competing artists was former Slovenian Eurovision contestant Martina Majerle who represented Slovenia in 2009 alongside Quartissimo.

Final
EMA 2015 took place on 28 February 2015 at the RTV Slovenija Studio 1 in Ljubljana, hosted by Nejc Šmit and former Slovenian Eurovision entrants Darja Švajger (1995, 1999), Maja Keuc (2011) and Tinkara Kovač (2014). In addition to the performances of the competing entries, Nadiya Bichkova, Brigita Vrhovnik Dorič, Maestro, Darja Švajger, Maja Keuc and Tinkara Kovač performed as guests. The winner was selected over two rounds of voting. In the first round, a three-member jury panel selected two entries to proceed to the second round. The jury consisted of the three female hosts: Darja Švajger, Maja Keuc and Tinkara Kovač. In the second round, a public vote selected "Here for You" performed by Maraaya as the winner.

At Eurovision 

According to Eurovision rules, all nations with the exceptions of the host country and the "Big Five" (France, Germany, Italy, Spain and the United Kingdom) are required to qualify from one of two semi-finals in order to compete for the final; the top ten countries from each semi-final progress to the final. In the 2015 contest, Australia also competed directly in the final as an invited guest nation. The European Broadcasting Union (EBU) split up the competing countries into five different pots based on voting patterns from previous contests, with countries with favourable voting histories put into the same pot. On 26 January 2015, a special allocation draw was held which placed each country into one of the two semi-finals, as well as which half of the show they would perform in. Slovenia was placed into the second semi-final, to be held on 21 May 2015, and was scheduled to perform in the second half of the show.

Once all the competing songs for the 2015 contest had been released, the running order for the semi-finals was decided by the shows' producers rather than through another draw, so that similar songs were not placed next to each other. Slovenia was set to perform in position 16, following the entry from Cyprus and before the entry from Poland.

In Slovenia, the semi-finals were televised on RTV SLO2 and the final was televised on RTV SLO1 with commentary by Andrej Hofer. The second semi-final and final were also broadcast via radio on Radio Val 202. The Slovenian spokesperson, who announced the Slovenian votes during the final, was 2014 Eurovision entrant Tinkara Kovač.

Semi-final

Maraaya took part in technical rehearsals on 14 and 16 May, followed by dress rehearsals on 20 and 21 May. This included the jury final where professional juries of each country, responsible for 50 percent of each country's vote, watched and voted on the competing entries.

The stage show featured the members of Maraaya dressed in outfits designed by Vesna Mirtelj: Marjetka Vovk wore a long white dress while Raay wore a casual black outfit. Marjetka also wore Sennheiser brand headphones, which was part of the performer's stage image. In regards to the headphones, Marjetka stated: "To be honest, some years ago I was afraid to be on the stage. I always felt more comfortable in a studio. I've asked Raay if it would be okay to perform with the headphones on and that's how this idea was born." Marjetka performed the song at the centre of the stage, while Raay was on the side playing a piano. The duo were joined by a backing dancer, Lara Balodis Slekovec, dressed in black with glowing elements on her sleeve, simulating the playing of a violin. The performance did not make use of the background LED screens and instead used bronze and blue stage lighting as a prominent feature. Three off-stage backing vocalists were also present: Manca Špik, Nika Zorjan and Karin Zemljič.

At the end of the show, Slovenia was announced as having finished in the top ten and subsequently qualifying for the grand final. It was later revealed that the Slovenia placed fifth in the semi-final, receiving a total of 92 points.

Final
Shortly after the second semi-final, a winner's press conference was held for the ten qualifying countries. As part of this press conference, the qualifying artists took part in a draw to determine which half of the grand final they would subsequently participate in. This draw was done in the order the countries were announced during the semi-final. Slovenia was drawn to compete in the first half. Following this draw, the shows' producers decided upon the running order of the final, as they had done for the semi-finals. Slovenia was subsequently placed to open the show and perform in position 1, before the entry from France.

Maraaya once again took part in dress rehearsals on 22 and 23 May before the final, including the jury final where the professional juries cast their final votes before the live show. Maraaya performed a repeat of their semi-final performance during the final on 23 May. At the conclusion of the voting, Slovenia placed fourteenth with 39 points.

Voting
Voting during the three shows consisted of 50 percent public televoting and 50 percent from a jury deliberation. The jury consisted of five music industry professionals who were citizens of the country they represent, with their names published before the contest to ensure transparency. This jury was asked to judge each contestant based on: vocal capacity; the stage performance; the song's composition and originality; and the overall impression by the act. In addition, no member of a national jury could be related in any way to any of the competing acts in such a way that they cannot vote impartially and independently. The individual rankings of each jury member were released shortly after the grand final.

Following the release of the full split voting by the EBU after the conclusion of the competition, it was revealed that Slovenia had placed nineteenth with the public televote and fifteenth with the jury vote in the final. In the public vote, Slovenia scored 27 points, while with the jury vote, Slovenia scored 36 points. In the second semi-final, Slovenia placed seventh with the public televote with 95 points and sixth with the jury vote, scoring 84 points.

Below is a breakdown of points awarded to Slovenia and awarded by Slovenia in the second semi-final and grand final of the contest, and the breakdown of the jury voting and televoting conducted during the two shows:

Points awarded to Slovenia

Points awarded by Slovenia

Detailed voting results
The following members comprised the Slovene jury:
 Tinkara Kovač (jury chairperson)singer, musician, composer, lyricist, represented Slovenia in the 2014 contest
 Miha Goršemusician, producer, composer
 Sandra Feketijasinger 
 singer, composer, producer
 singer, composer, lyricist

References 

2015
Countries in the Eurovision Song Contest 2015
Eurovision